Linsey Pollak  is an Australian musician, instrument maker, composer, musical director and community music facilitator.

Pollak studied classical clarinet until age 19. Then, at university, he started making and selling bamboo flutes. He dropped out in the second year of physiology to get more time to make instruments.

Pollak has recorded 31 albums. He toured his solo shows extensively in Europe, North America and Asia as well as performing at most major festivals around Australia. He has devised many large festival pieces such as 'BimBamBoo' and 'Sound Forest', as well as collaborating on many music and theatre projects around Australia. Pollak helped establish the now defunct 'Kulcha', The Multicultural Arts Centre of Western Australia, and has co-ordinated five cross-cultural music ensembles.

Pollak has also worked as a musical instrument maker for 40 years and has designed a number of new wind instruments.  He has specialized in woodwind instruments from Eastern Europe such as the Macedonian gaida.

Pollak lives in Maleny, Queensland. He creates musical instruments from unlikely objects such as vegetables.

Pollak was awarded the Medal of the Order of Australia in the 2021 Queen's Birthday Honours, for "service to the performing arts, and to music".

References

External links
 

Australian musicians
Australian musical instrument makers
Living people
Recipients of the Medal of the Order of Australia
Year of birth missing (living people)